Peter Granville Lee (born 27 August 1945), affectionately known as "Leapy", is a former cricketer who played for Northamptonshire and Lancashire County Cricket Clubs. He was a right-arm fast-medium bowler who moved the ball off the seam and became among the most effective bowlers in English county cricket during the 1970s. Presumably because his batting was impotent as shown by his highest first-class score in more than 200 matches being 26, Lee appears never to have been considered seriously for Test cricket. He toured South Africa twice with teams organised by Derrick Robins. He was born at Arthingworth, Northamptonshire.

Lee played for five seasons from 1967 for Northamptonshire without ever becoming a regular in the side. He moved to Lancashire in 1972 largely as insurance for the likelihood that regular opening bowlers Peter Lever and Ken Shuttleworth would be called up for Test cricket by England, but with those bowlers doing extremely badly, Lee became their first choice opening bowler. 1973 saw Lee massively surpass his first season's promise and become the mainstay of Lancashire's bowling, actually taking more wickets in the County Championship than any other bowler.

In 1974 Lee was consistently handicapped by injuries and illness: he played about half his county's matches but was at no point fully fit Nevertheless, he returned for a full season and even greater success in 1975. His 112 first-class wickets was the highest by any bowler that season: indeed the highest by any England-qualified bowler during the 1970s. He was named as a Wisden Cricketer of the Year in the 1976 edition of the almanack.

Having reached the top of the tree as a bowler, Peter Lee remained one of the most persistent and hard-working county bowlers during 1976 and 1977, though he took only two-thirds as many wickets as he did in 1975. However, 1978 saw Lee play only one match due to a serious shoulder injury which led to a delayed operation after weeks of examination. Lee made a "gallant" return to fitness in 1979 but completely lost form, finishing with 22 wickets for 40 runs apiece that season. Indeed, apart from a career-best eight for 34 against Oxford University in 1980, Lee never again did much worthy of his former reputation, and at the end of 1982 he was released by Lancashire. After that, he played for Durham in the Minor Counties Championship during the 1983 season, but took only sixteen wickets for 29.56 apiece and was released.

During the 20/20 Finals Day in August 2011, Paul Allott suggested Lee's decline coincided with the total loss of his run up, similar to the yips suffered mainly by left arm spinners.

References

External links 
 

1945 births
Living people
English cricketers
Northamptonshire cricketers
Lancashire cricketers
Wisden Cricketers of the Year
Marylebone Cricket Club cricketers
Durham cricketers
D. H. Robins' XI cricketers